Pierre-Paul is a French double name, formed using the names Pierre and Paul.

List of people

Given name 
 Pierre-Paul Durieu (1830–1899), Roman Catholic missionary and bishop
 Pierre-Paul Grassé (1895–1985), French zoologist 
 Pierre-Paul Guieysse (1841–1914), French Socialist politician
 Pierre-Paul Lemercier de La Rivière de Saint-Médard (1719–1801), French colonial administrator and economist
 Pierre-Paul Margane de Lavaltrie (1743–1810), seigneur and political figure in Lower Canada
 Pierre-Paul Prud'hon (1758–1823), French Romantic painter and draughtsman
 Pierre-Paul Renders (born 1963), Belgian film director and screenwriter
 Pierre-Paul Riquet (1609?-1680), French engineer and canal builder
 Pierre-Paul Saunier (1751–1818), French gardener
 Pierre-Paul Schweitzer (1912–1994), French Managing Director of the IMF
 Pierre-Paul Sirven (1709–1777), French archivist and notary

Surname 
 Jason Pierre-Paul (born 1989), American football player

Compound given names
French masculine given names
Surnames of French origin
Compound surnames
Saints Peter and Paul